Christopher McCann (born September 29, 1952) is an American theater, film and television actor. He was nominated for a Drama Desk Award and won an Obie Award for his performance in the 1993 play The Lights, written by Howard Korder.

Career 
He has starred in several Broadway and Off-Broadway roles including the original Vince in Sam Shepard's Buried Child, Mihai in Mad Forest produced by the Manhattan Theatre Club Stage, Richard III at Theater at St. Clement's Church, and Dr. Miklos Nyiszli in The Grey Zone at the MCC Theater. In 1994, McCann was nominated for a Drama Desk Award and won an Obie Award for his performance in The Lights at Lincoln Center Theater.

His television credits include Law & Order, Numb3rs, Now and Again, and Miami Vice, while his film credits include American Violet, Acts of Worship, The Repair Shop,, Macbeth in Manhattan and Minyan.

He teaches in the Professional Actor Training Program at State University of New York at Purchase.

Filmography

Film

Television

References

External links

Christopher McCann at Internet Off-Broadway Database

Obie Award recipients
1952 births
Living people
American male actors
Tisch School of the Arts alumni